Darney is a commune in the Vosges department in Grand Est in northeastern France.

It is located in the Vôge Plateau, around the location of the source of the river Saône.  Darney is known for its forest of oak and beech trees.

History
Darney is built on a promontory dominating the valley of the Saône.  The Romans built a castle here to control the area, and watch the forested countryside.  As a fortified town in the Middle Ages, Darney had towers and two fortified gates, and was known as the "city of thirty towers".  Theobald II, Duke of Lorraine gave the town its church in 1308.  The town suffered during the Thirty years war, being razed by the Swedes led by Bernard of Saxe-Weimar, who were allies of the French, in 1634.  The castle of the time was destroyed in 1639.  Remnants of this castle still exist, as well as the current, smaller castle, which was built in 1725.

During the First World War, Darney was the rallying point for Czech and Slovak volunteers, where they were stationed at Camp Kleber.  Due to their presence, on 30 June 1918, Czechoslovakian independence was proclaimed in the village.  The French President, Raymond Poincaré inspected 6,000 Czech and Slovak legionnaires, before handing over the Czechoslovakian army flag to Edvard Beneš, Minister of the Interior and of Foreign Affairs within the Provisional Czechoslovak government.  This flag became the flag of the 21st rifle regiment.

The former town hall is now a Franco-Czechoslovak museum, dedicated to Camp Kleber, the Czechoslovak troops stationed there, and the birth of the Czechoslovak state.

Twin towns
Darney is twinned with the town of Slavkov u Brna, also known as Austerlitz, in Moravia.

Points of interest
 Arboretum de la Hutte
Exceptional Darney forest and wilderness assets of Ourche Valley: Oak trees, roe deers, red deers, wild cats. The Ourche river. Scenic views at La Hutte with peaceful pond and lakes, the old chapel and of course the giant trees of the Arboretum. Scenic views at Abbaye de Droiteval.

Natives of Darney
Antoine Argoud
Nicolas-Sylvestre Bergier
Xavier Breton
Louis Morizot

See also
Communes of the Vosges department

References

External links

 

Communes of Vosges (department)
Duchy of Lorraine